Mandera is the capital of Mandera County in the former North Eastern Province of Kenya.

Districts
Mandera is the capital of the Mandera District.

As a whole, it used to constitute one district in previous administrations, which is now divided into six sub-counties and Constituencies; namely, 
 Mandera East which represents Mandera Town 
 Mandera Central  
 Mandera West 
 Mandera North 
 Banissa
Elwak
Lafey

The county occupies an area of 26,744 km2.

Among the notable incident of Mandera history was the Rhamu Incident of the 1977 in which Somali military invaded Ethiopian defences from the Kenyan side in which a force of 1500 Somali soldiers attacked a border post, and killed 30 Kenyan police officers and soldiers. The Somali army successfully crossed into the Sidamo Region of Ethiopia in the so called Ogaden War.

Demographics
Most of Mandera's inhabitants are ethnic Somali. Economic mainstay largely remains livestock trade.

Climate

Mandera's climate is categorized as arid under the Köppen climate classification. Temperatures tend to be hot throughout the year. Precipitation is extremely low, with the area receiving a minimal amount of rain. Droughts are not unusual, often resulting in significant loss of livestock in rural areas where pastoralism is common.

See also 
 Mandera triangle for the border region disputed between Kenya, Somalia and Ethiopia, centered on the city of Mandera

References

External links
Districts of Kenya

Populated places in Mandera County
County capitals in Kenya